Frank Vlastnik (born May 30, 1969) is an American author and actor known for his roles in several Broadway productions.

Early life and education 
Vlastnik was born in Peru, Illinois. He graduated from Illinois Wesleyan University in 1987.

Career 
Vlastnik is best known as an original cast member in the short-lived musicals Big, Sweet Smell of Success, and A Year with Frog and Toad on Broadway, and Off-Broadway in Stephen Sondheim's musical Saturday Night. His big break came when he was cast as the original understudy for the leading role in Big. He later starred on and off-Broadway in A Year with Frog and Toad in which he played the 'Snail with the Mail', and was featured on the cast album. He also guest-starred on episodes of Law & Order, The Good Wife, Boardwalk Empire, Person of Interest, and Elementary. He is the co-author of the books Broadway Musicals and Sitcoms, both published by Black Dog & Leventhal Publishers.

In 2021, Vlastnik co-authored The Art of Bob Mackie, about the life and career of Bob Mackie.

Filmography

Film

Television

References

External links 
 
 
 Broadways Musicals on Amazon

American male stage actors
1969 births
American male television actors
Living people
People from Peru, Illinois
Male actors from Illinois